Bernard Frimat (born 12 October 1940 in Paimbœuf) is a former member of the Senate of France, who represented the Nord department.  He is a member of the Socialist Party.

References
Page on the Senate website 

1940 births
Living people
French Senators of the Fifth Republic
Socialist Party (France) politicians
Senators of Nord (French department)
People from Loire-Atlantique